Anita Lindman (née Lamm; 14 May 1932 – 31 August 2018) was a Swedish television announcer and producer. She was particularly known for the children's programme Anita och Televinken, a puppet show television series. She was a daughter of Uno Lamm and Ingalill Beckman. Lindman died in Norrtälje in 2018, 86 years old.

Selected filmography

References

External links 
Anita Lindman at Swedish Film Database
Anita Lindman at LIBRIS
Anita Lindman at Svensk mediedatabas

1932 births
2018 deaths
Swedish television actresses
Swedish television producers
Women television producers
People from Ludvika Municipality